"Can't Say I'm Sorry" is a song by Danish pop singer Bryan Rice. It was written by Pelle Nylén and Andreas Carlsson, and released as the third single from the singer's debut album, Confessional on 30 October 2006.

Track listing
Digital download
"Can't Say I'm Sorry" (Remee & Jay Jay Mix) – 3:02

Erik Segerstedt version

Runner-up of the third season of Idol in Sweden, Erik Segerstedt released the song as his debut single in 2007 from his debut album A Different Shade. It peaked at number one in Sweden.

Charts

Theo Tams version
Canadian pop singer and the winner of the sixth season of Canadian Idol, Theo Tams, covered this song for his debut album, Give It All Away in 2009.

References

2006 singles
2007 singles
Bryan Rice songs
Number-one singles in Sweden
Songs written by Andreas Carlsson
Songs written by Pelle Nylén
2006 songs
Sony BMG singles
EMI Records singles